The 1982–83 season was Kilmarnock's 81st in Scottish League Competitions. They finished bottom of the table and were relegated at the end of the season to the First Division. They would not return to the top league for 10 years.

Scottish Premier Division

Scottish League Cup

Group stage

Group 8 final table

Knockout stage

Scottish Cup

See also 
List of Kilmarnock F.C. seasons

References

External links 
Kilmarnock Results For Season 1873/1874

Kilmarnock F.C. seasons
Kilmarnock